"Misery Loves Company" is a 1961 song by Jerry Reed, recorded first by Porter Wagoner.  The single was the second number one country song of his career staying at the top spot for two weeks.  "Misery Loves Company" spent twenty-nine weeks on the chart.

Chart performance

Cover versions
It was covered in 1977 by Moe Bandy on his LP Cowboys Ain't Supposed to Cry. 
Another cover was recorded by Ronnie Milsap, and was credited as a B-side to his 1980 No. 1 country hit "Cowboys and Clowns."

References

1961 songs
Porter Wagoner songs
Songs written by Jerry Reed
Song recordings produced by Chet Atkins